Nanjaraja Wodeyar (Nanjaraja Wodeyar Bahadur; 1748 – 2 August 1770) was the nineteenth maharaja of the Kingdom of Mysore for only four years, from 1766 to 1770, as puppet under sarvadhikari Hyder Ali, like his father was.

Life
He was eldest son of Maharaja Krishnaraja Wodeyar II, and succeeded on the death of his father in 1766.

See also
Wodeyar dynasty

1748 births
1770 deaths
Kings of Mysore
Nanjaraja
18th-century Indian royalty